Derek Wolfe (born February 24, 1990) is a former  American football defensive end and a current sports radio host. He played college football at the University of Cincinnati and was selected 36th overall by the Denver Broncos in the 2012 NFL Draft, playing his first 8 years with them before signing with the Baltimore Ravens in 2020. Wolfe announced his retirement on July 28, 2022.

Early life
Wolfe is from the rural town of Negley, Ohio, near the state line with Pennsylvania. He attended Beaver Local High School in Lisbon, Ohio.

Considered only a two-star recruit by Rivals.com, Wolfe was a standout at Beaver Local High School and is the only player in the school's history ever to be drafted by the NFL.

College career
Wolfe played four years (2008–2011) at Cincinnati. He accumulated 162 total tackles, 37 tackles for loss, and 19 sacks during his tenure.

Wolfe was named Co-Big East Defensive Player of the Year as a senior.

Wolfe was the first Beaver Local High School graduate to get drafted in the school's history, and the first Mahoning Valley native selected in the 2012 NFL Draft.

Professional career

NFL Combine

Denver Broncos
The Denver Broncos selected Wolfe in the second round (36th overall) of the 2012 NFL Draft. Wolfe was the fourth defensive tackle drafted in 2012.

On May 21, 2012, the Denver Broncos signed Wolfe to a four-year, $5.20 million contract that includes $3.09 million guaranteed and a signing bonus of $2.22 million.

In his first NFL game in the regular season against the Pittsburgh Steelers, Wolfe came out with 3 tackles and a sack for a loss of 9 yards.

Wolfe finished his rookie season with 40 tackles, six sacks, and two passes defended. His six sacks were third most on the team, behind Von Miller and Elvis Dumervil.

Wolfe had a tough sophomore season. In a preseason game against the Seattle Seahawks, Wolfe suffered a spinal cord injury and was carted off the field. That, along with two bouts of food poisoning, led to him losing 20 pounds, and he was therefore not as productive on the field. On November 29, Wolfe suffered a seizure on the bus ride to the airport for their Kansas City Chiefs matchup. (After the season, it was reported that the seizure was related to the spinal cord injury.) Despite hopes that he might return to the field, he was eventually placed on Injured Reserve. Without Wolfe, the Broncos reached Super Bowl XLVIII where they lost to the Seattle Seahawks.

The 2015 season was the best of Wolfe's career. After serving a four-game suspension for a PED violation, Wolfe returned to establish himself as one of the best-run stuffers in the game, which eventually led to him being named AFC Defensive Player of the Week after the Broncos defense completely neutralized the undefeated Green Bay Packers offense in Week 8.

On January 15, 2016, Wolfe signed a four-year extension with the Broncos worth $36.7 million.

On February 7, 2016, Wolfe was part of the Broncos team that won Super Bowl 50. In the game, the Broncos defeated the Carolina Panthers by a score of 24–10. He had five tackles and 0.5 sacks in the Super Bowl.

In 2016, Wolfe posted a career-high in tackles with 51, and in passes defended with 4.

The Broncos finished the 2016 season with a 9–7 record and missed the playoffs for the first time in Wolfe's career.

On December 5, 2017, Wolfe was placed on injured reserve with a neck injury.

On December 2, 2019, Wolfe was placed on injured reserve after suffering a dislocated elbow in Week 13.

Baltimore Ravens
On March 31, 2020, Wolfe signed a one-year, $3 million deal with the Baltimore Ravens.

In Week 15 against the Jacksonville Jaguars, Wolfe recorded his first sack as a Raven on Gardner Minshew and recovered a fumble lost by Minshew during the 40–14 win.
 
Wolfe agreed to a three-year, $12 million contract extension with the Ravens on March 17, 2021.

On October 2, 2021, Wolfe suffered a hip injury during practice and was placed on injured reserve.
On October 26, 2021, Wolfe was designated to return to practice from injured reserve. However, on November 15, 2021, head coach John Harbaugh said that Wolfe was expected to be out for the rest of the season.

On June 14, 2022, Wolfe and the Ravens came to terms on an injury settlement leading to his release from the team.

Comments concerning NFL protests 
During the discussion concerning kneeling during the national anthem, Wolfe sent comments to ESPN stating the following: this is the "greatest country in the world and if you don't think we are the greatest country in the world and you reside here, then why do you stay?"

Retirement
On July 29, 2022, Wolfe announced his retirement from professional football, signing a one-day contract with the Denver Broncos to retire as a member of the team.

Broadcasting career
On October 3, 2022, Wolfe joined 104.3 The Fan in Denver as a sports-talk radio host on the station's marquee show, "The Drive."

NFL career statistics

Regular season

Playoffs
Source:

References

External links

Denver Broncos bio
Cincinnati Bearcats bio

1990 births
Living people
American football defensive tackles
Baltimore Ravens players
Cincinnati Bearcats football players
Denver Broncos players
Ohio Republicans
People from East Liverpool, Ohio
People from Lisbon, Ohio
Players of American football from Ohio